Hypnotic is the fourth and final studio album by Wild Orchid. It marks the first and only album released by Wild Orchid since Stacy Ferguson, a former member of the band, left and became a member of the hip hop group The Black Eyed Peas. There are no singles released from this album.

Album information
After the departure of Ferguson, Ridel and Sands recorded "Hypnotic" under the label Yellow Brick Records throughout 2002. The album was released directly on the band's website on January 15, 2003. The duo hoped that they could get a deal with a major label and officially release the album, but it never happened. The album was only available online, and only 5,000 copies were printed and sold.

They intended for "All The Way" to be the first single, followed by Hypnotic however none of the songs were released to radio. Wild Orchid performed a couple of concerts in support of the album, but never got major publicity for the album.

Track listing
All songs co-written by Stefanie Ridel or Renee Sands unless noted.
 Kiss the Sky - 3:52
 All the Way (Stacy Ferguson, Ridel, Sands) - 2:54
 Hypnotic - 3:29
 It's On - 2:42
 On the Floor - 3:12
 My Lover - 3:17
 Sugarfly - 2:59
 Simon Sez (Ferguson, Ridel, Sands) - 3:47
 Contagious (Ferguson, Ridel, Sands) - 3:27
 All Night Long (Ferguson, Ridel, Sands) - 3:29
 Love in All Control - 2:59
 Let the Record Spin (Ferguson, Ridel, Sands) - 3:14
 Hypnotic (Remix) - 4:00

References

2003 albums
RCA Records albums
Wild Orchid (group) albums
Unreleased albums